The 1925 UCI Track Cycling World Championships were the World Championship for track cycling. They took place in Amsterdam, Netherlands from 3 to 10 August 1925. Three events for men were contested, two for professionals and one for amateurs.

Medal summary

Medal table

See also
 1925 UCI Road World Championships

References

Track cycling
UCI Track Cycling World Championships by year
International cycle races hosted by the Netherlands
UCI Track Cycling World Championships
UCI Track Cycling World Championships
1920s in Amsterdam
Cycling in Amsterdam